The Stara Zagora Uprising is an attempt of the Bulgarian Revolutionary Central Committee to organize an armed uprising in Bulgaria in 1875 in order to overthrow the Ottoman Empire.

Organization and regions 
On the 12 August 1875, the Bulgarian Revolutionary Central Committee or BRCC, made the decision to prepare the entire people of Bulgaria for an Uprising. Five regions were distributed - Ruse-Shumen, Veliko Tarnovo, Sliven and Lovech-Troyan. The capital location of the Uprising was chosen to be Stara Zagora, hence the name. The leader of the Stara Zagora Uprising and region was Stefan Stambolov, who is considered one of the founders of Modern post-Ottoman Bulgaria. Some members of the committee, however, do not entirely agree on the proper timing of the Uprising and want to wait more.

Because of this disunion of opinions, on 16 September in Stara Zagora, not enough rebels gather to support the cause. Some of the rebels hide or leave the country, whereas others are chased by the Turks, like the brothers Mihail and Georgi Zhekov.

Simultaneous uprisings 
The Stara Zagora Uprising was very massive in the villages around Stara Zagora. More than 800 people join the rebellion and add up to 6 large rural groups of rebels. Some of them start joining the rebels of the city. Heavy battles are led in the area of Elhovo, Samuilovo and Obruchishte. The rebel groups of Stefan Chifutov (105 people) and Rusi Bakardzhiyata (120 people) fight the battle with the Turks near Elhovo.

Simultaneously with the Stara Zagora Uprising, there are Uprisings in Shumen and Ruse. There are two small rebel groups which later disband when the news of the failed uprising reach them.

The Stara Zagora Uprising serves as a check of the rebel strength and readiness to give way for the liberation through the April Uprising in 1876 which would eventually capture the attention of the Great Powers. 

After the Uprising has been dispersed, the Ottoman authorities impose serious penalties. More than 600 people are arrested and punished with death and other forms of torture.

Notable participants 

 Ivan Vladikov
 Kolyo Ganchev
 Stefan Stambolov
 Ivan Hadzhidimitrov
 Gospodin Mihaylovski

 Hristo Shikirov
 Rusi Argov
 Nikola Raynov
 Zahari Stoyanov
 Georgi Ikonomov
 Georgi Stoev
 Panayot Volov
 Ivan Andonov

References 

1875 in the Ottoman Empire
Bulgarian rebellions
Rebellions against the Ottoman Empire
Stara Zagora
Conflicts in 1875
September 1875 events
19th-century rebellions